Vasily Gorbachyov, also transcripted as Vasily Gorbachov and Vasili Gorbatchev, (born 9 February 1965 in Vitebsk) is a former Belarusian cross-country skier. He competed in the men's 30 kilometre freestyle event at the 1994 Winter Olympics.

References

External links
 

1965 births
Living people
Belarusian male cross-country skiers
Olympic cross-country skiers of Belarus
Cross-country skiers at the 1994 Winter Olympics
Sportspeople from Vitebsk